In international law, a stateless person is someone who is "not considered as a national by any state under the operation of its law". Some stateless people are also refugees. However, not all refugees are stateless, and many people who are stateless have never crossed an international border. On November 12, 2018, the United Nations High Commissioner for Refugees stated there are about 12 million stateless people in the world.

Causes

Conflict of law 
Conflicting nationality laws are one of the causes of statelessness. Nationality is usually acquired through one of two modes, although many nations recognize both modes today:
 Jus soli ("right of the soil") denotes a regime by which nationality is acquired through birth on the territory of the state. This is common in the Americas.
 Jus sanguinis ("right of blood") is a regime by which nationality is acquired through descent, usually from a parent who is a national. Almost all states in Europe, Asia, Africa, and Oceania grant citizenship at birth based upon the principle of jus sanguinis.

A person who does not have either parent eligible to pass citizenship by jus sanguinis can be stateless at birth if born in a state which does not recognize jus soli. For instance, a child born outside Canada to two Canadian parents would not be a Canadian citizen, since jus sanguinis is only recognized for the first generation in Canada. If the child were born in India and neither parent had Indian citizenship, then the child might be stateless since India confers citizenship only to children born to at least one Indian parent, but would more likely inherit citizenship from a parent.

By sex 
Although many states allow the acquisition of nationality through parental descent irrespective of where the child is born, some do not allow female citizens to confer nationality to their children. Women in 27 countries, mostly in Africa and Asia cannot pass their nationality onto their offspring. This can result in statelessness when the father is stateless, unknown, or otherwise unable to confer nationality. Beginning about 2015 there have been changes in favor of sex neutrality in nationality laws in some nations, including reforms in Algeria, Morocco, and Senegal that may inform change elsewhere. For example, Algeria amended its nationality code in 2005 to grant Algerian nationality to children born in or outside Algeria to an Algerian mother or father. Moreover, the Convention on the Elimination of All Forms of Discrimination Against Women prohibits sex-based discrimination in the conferral of nationality.

An important measure to prevent statelessness at birth bestows nationality to children born in a territory who would otherwise be stateless. This norm is stipulated in the 1961 Convention on the Reduction of Statelessness; appears in several regional human rights treaties, including the American Convention on Human Rights, the European Convention on Nationality, and the African Charter on the Rights and Welfare of the Child; and is implicit in the United Nations Convention on the Rights of the Child.

Discrimination 
In most large-scale statelessness situations, statelessness is a result of discrimination. Many states define their body of citizens based on ethnicity, leading to the exclusion of large groups. This violates international laws against discrimination. The United Nations Committee on the Elimination of Racial Discrimination stated on October 1, 2014, that the "deprivation of citizenship on the basis of race, colour, descent, or national or ethnic origin is a breach of States' obligations to ensure non-discriminatory enjoyment of the right to nationality".

State succession 
In some cases, statelessness is a consequence of state succession. Some people become stateless when their state of nationality ceases to exist, or when the territory on which they live comes under the control of another state. This was the case after the Soviet Union had disintegrated in 1991, and also in the cases of Yugoslavia , East Pakistan and Ethiopia. According to the United Nations Office of Legal Affairs, the Council of Europe Convention on the Avoidance of Statelessness in Relation to State Succession is the only treaty that aims to reduce this problem. Seven states have joined it.

Administrative obstacles 
People may also become stateless as a result of administrative and practical problems, especially when they are from a group whose nationality is questioned. Individuals might be entitled to citizenship but unable to undertake the necessary procedural steps. They may be required to pay excessive fees for documentation proving nationality, to provide documentation that is not available to them, or to meet unrealistic deadlines; or they may face geographic or literacy barriers.

In disruptive conflict or post-conflict situations, many people find that difficulties in completing simple administrative procedures are exacerbated. Such obstacles may affect the ability of individuals to complete procedures such as birth registration, fundamental to the prevention of statelessness in children. Whilst birth registration alone does not confer citizenship on a child, the documentation of place of birth and parentage is instrumental in proving the link between an individual and a state for the acquisition of nationality. The United Nations Children's Fund (UNICEF) estimated in 2013 that 230 million children under the age of 5 have not been registered.

Not holding proof of nationality—being "undocumented"—is not the same as being stateless, but the lack of identity documents such as a birth certificate can lead to statelessness. Millions of people live, or have lived, their entire lives with no documents, without their nationality ever being questioned.

Two factors are of particular importance:
 whether the nationality in question was acquired automatically or through some form of registration
 whether the person has ever been denied documents on the basis that they are not a national.
If nationality is acquired automatically, the person is a national regardless of documentation status (although in practice, the person may face problems accessing certain rights and services because they are undocumented, not because they are stateless). If registration is required, then the person is not a national until that process has been completed.

As a practical matter, the longer a person is undocumented, the greater the likelihood that they will end up in a situation where no state recognizes them as a national.

Renunciation 
In rare cases, individuals may become stateless upon renouncing their citizenship (e.g., "world citizen" Garry Davis and, from 1896 to 1901, Albert Einstein, who, in January 1896, at the age of 16, was released from his Württemberg citizenship after, with his father's help, filing a petition to that effect; in February 1901 his application for Swiss citizenship was accepted). People who subscribe to Voluntaryist, Agorist, or some other philosophical, political, or religious beliefs may desire or seek statelessness. Many states do not allow citizens to renounce their nationality unless they acquire another. However, consular officials are unlikely to be familiar with the citizenship laws of all countries, so there may still be situations where renunciation leads to effective statelessness.

Non-state territories 
Only states can have nationals, and people of non-state territories may be stateless. This includes for instance residents of occupied territories where statehood never emerged in the first place, has ceased to exist and/or is largely unrecognized. Examples include the Palestinian territories, Western Sahara and Northern Cyprus (depending on the interpretation of what constitutes statehood and sovereignty). People who are recognized to be citizens by the government of an unrecognized country may not consider themselves stateless, but nevertheless may be widely regarded as such especially if other countries refuse to honor passports issued by an unrecognized state.

While statelessness in some form has existed continuously throughout human history, the international community has only been concerned with its eradication since the middle of the 20th century. In 1954, the United Nations adopted the Convention relating to the Status of Stateless Persons, which provides a framework for the protection of stateless people. Seven years later, the United Nations adopted the Convention on the Reduction of Statelessness. In addition, a range of regional and international human rights treaties guarantee a right to nationality, with special protections for certain groups, including stateless persons.

States bound by the 1989 Convention on the Rights of the Child are obligated to ensure that every child acquires a nationality. The convention requires states to implement this provision in particular where the child would otherwise be stateless, and in a manner that is in the best interests of the child.

The status of a person who might be stateless ultimately depends on the viewpoint of the state with respect to the individual or a group of people. In some cases, the state makes its view clear and explicit; in others, its viewpoint is harder to discern. In those cases, one may need to rely on prima facie evidence of the view of the state, which in turn may give rise to a presumption of statelessness.

Stateless nations 
A stateless nation is an ethnic group or nation that does not possess its own state. The term "stateless" implies that the group "should have" such a state (country). The term was coined in 1983 by political scientist Jacques Leruez in his book L'Écosse, une nation sans État about the peculiar position of Scotland within the British state. It was later adopted and popularized by Scottish scholars such as David McCrone, Michael Keating and T. M. Devine. A notable contemporary example of a stateless nation is the Kurds. The Kurdish population is estimated to be between 30 and 45 million, but they do not have a recognised sovereign state. Members of stateless nations are often not necessarily personally stateless as individuals, as they are frequently recognised as citizens of one or more recognized state(s).

History

In antiquity
In a historical sense, statelessness could reasonably be considered to be the default human condition that existed universally from the evolution of human species to the emergence of the first human civilizations. Historically in every inhabited region on Earth, prior the emergence of states as polities humans organized into tribal groups. In the absence of written laws, people living in tribal settings were typically expected to adhere to tribal customs and owed allegiance to their tribe and/or tribal leaders. As states began to form, a distinction developed between those who had some form of legal attachment to a more complex polity recognized to be a state in contrast to those who did not. The latter, often living in tribes and in regions not yet organized into and/or conquered by more powerful states, would widely be considered to be stateless in a modern sense. Historically, there is considerable correlation between those who would meet the modern definition of statelessness and those the contemporary ruling classes of the extant states would have deemed to be mere barbarians.

However, civilizations of this period more often distinguished between a subject and a slave as opposed to between a citizen and a subject. In many monarchies, the concept of citizenship as something distinct from that of a subject did not exist – people under a monarch's rule who were considered subjects typically enjoyed more rights than a slave, and would presumably not have been considered "stateless" by the monarch. But even slaves in a monarchical state were often considered to have a legal status more desirable, at least from the perspective of the ruler, compared to those living outside the frontiers in tribal settings who were typically regarded as barbarians. Depending on the circumstances, a monarch seeking to conquer a frontier region would seek to either subjugate or enslave the inhabitants, but either would impart on the conquered population a change from stateless barbarian to some form of legal status in which allegiance and/or obedience to the ruler could be expected.

With the emergence of the concept of citizenship in the Greco-Roman world, the status of slaves and inhabitants of conquered territories during Classical antiquity became in some ways analogous to contemporary statelessness. In antiquity, such "statelessness" affected captive and subject populations denied full citizenship, including those enslaved (e.g., conquered populations excluded from Roman citizenship, such as the Gauls immediately following the Gallic Wars, or the Israelites under Babylonian captivity). However, there was a major difference between captive and subject populations in contrast to those living outside the boundaries of cohesive states – while both could be considered stateless, the latter typically only needed to adhere to local tribal customs whereas the former were not only expected to obey the laws of the state they were living in, but were often subjected to laws not imposed on and punishments not inflicted on full citizens. Among the more widely-known examples of this was the Romans' frequent use of crucifixion to punish Roman subjects, considered to be a highly degrading form of capital punishment that could not legally be inflicted on Roman citizens.

Before World War II 

Some characteristics of statelessness could be observed among apostates and slaves in Islamic society (the former shunned for rejecting their religious birth identity, the latter having been separated from that identity and subsumed into an underclass). Statelessness also used to characterize the Romani people, whose traditional nomadic lifestyles meant that they traveled across lands claimed by others.

The Nansen International Office for Refugees was an international organization of the League of Nations in charge of refugees from 1930 to 1939. It received the Nobel Peace Prize in 1938. Nansen passports, designed in 1922 by founder Fridtjof Nansen, were internationally recognized identity cards issued to stateless refugees. In 1942, they were honored by governments in 52 countries.

Many Jews became stateless before and during the Holocaust, because the Nuremberg laws of 1935 stripped them of their German citizenship.

After World War II 
The United Nations (UN) was set up in 1945, immediately after the end of World War II. From its inception, the UN had to deal with the mass atrocities of the war, including the huge refugee populations across Europe. To address the nationality and legal status of these refugees, the United Nations Economic and Social Council (ECOSOC) requested that the UN Secretary-General carry out a study of statelessness in 1948.

In 1948, the Universal Declaration on Human Rights (UDHR) was adopted. It provided both a right to asylum (Article 14) and a right to nationality (Article 15). The declaration also expressly prohibited arbitrary deprivation of nationality, which had affected many of the wartime refugees.

In 1949, the International Law Commission put "Nationality, including statelessness", on its list of topics of international law provisionally selected for codification. In 1950, at the behest of ECOSOC, that item was given priority, and ECOSOC appointed an ad hoc Committee on Refugees and Stateless People to draft a convention. A treaty on refugees was prepared with a draft protocol addressing the status of stateless persons.

The Convention Relating to the Status of Refugees was adopted on July 28, 1951. As of January 2005, it had attracted the signatures of 145 state parties. 

The International Law Commission, at its fifth session in 1953, produced both a Draft Convention on the Elimination of Future Statelessness and a Draft Convention on the Reduction of Future Statelessness. ECOSOC approved both drafts. In 1954, the UN adopted the Convention relating to the Status of Stateless Persons. This convention provided a definition of a stateless person (which has since become part of customary international law, according to the International Law Commission) and set out a number of rights that stateless persons should enjoy. The convention thus became the basis for an international protection regime for stateless persons. However, to ensure that the rights enumerated in the convention are protected, states need to be able to identify stateless individuals.

Seven years later, in 1961—only one year after the 1954 convention entered into force—the UN adopted the Convention on the Reduction of Statelessness.

In 2014, following a series of expert meetings, UNHCR issued a Handbook on Protection of Stateless Persons.

Stateless refugees covered by the 1951 convention should be treated in accordance with international refugee laws. As of September 1, 2015, 86 states were party to the 1954 convention, up from 65 when UNHCR launched its conventions campaign in 2011.

Statelessness since 1961 
On December 13, 1975, the 1961 Convention on the Reduction of Statelessness entered into force. It provides a number of standards regarding acquisition and loss of nationality, including automatic loss, renunciation, and deprivation of nationality.

In 1974, the UN General Assembly (UNGA) requested that UNHCR undertake the functions established by the Convention on the Reduction of Statelessness. While the convention had only 37 state parties on January 1, 2011, 33 states pledged to accede to it at a ministerial event organized by UNHCR in December 2011. As of September 1, 2015, the number of state parties had increased to 64.

Starting in 1994, the UNHCR Executive Committee (ExCom) and the UNGA asked UNHCR to broaden its activities concerning statelessness to include all states. In 1996, UNHCR was asked by the UNGA to actively promote accessions to the 1954 and 1961 conventions, as well as to provide interested states with technical and advisory services pertaining to the preparation and implementation of nationality legislation.

An internal evaluation released in 2001 suggested that UNHCR had done little to exercise its mandate on statelessness. Only two individuals were tasked with overseeing work in that area at UNHCR headquarters, though some field officers had been trained to address the issue. The evaluation also noted that there was no dedicated budget line.

Concerned organisations such as the Open Society Justice Initiative and Refugees International have called for UNHCR to dedicate more human and financial resources to statelessness. In 2006, a statelessness unit (now a statelessness section) was established in Geneva, and staffing has increased both in headquarters and in the field. As part of an overhaul of UNHCR's budget structure in 2010, the budget dedicated to statelessness increased from approximately US$12 million in 2009 to $69.5 million in 2015.

In addition to regular staff in regional and country offices, UNHCR has regional statelessness officers in Dakar, Senegal, for West Africa; Nairobi, Kenya, for the Horn of Africa; Pretoria, South Africa, for Southern Africa; San José, Costa Rica, for the Americas; Bangkok, Thailand, for Asia and the Pacific; Almaty, Kazakhstan, for Central Asia; Brussels, Belgium, for Europe; and Amman, Jordan, for the Middle East and North Africa.

In 2004, ExCom instructed UNHCR to pay particular attention to situations of protracted statelessness and to explore, in cooperation with states, measures that would ameliorate and end these situations. In 2006, it provided UNHCR with more specific guidance on how to implement its mandate. The Conclusion on Identification, Prevention and Reduction of Statelessness and Protection of Stateless Persons requires UNHCR to work with governments, other UN agencies, and civil society to address statelessness. UNHCR's activities are currently categorized as identification, prevention, reduction, and protection.

UNHCR has achieved some success with campaigns to prevent and reduce statelessness among peoples in the Crimean peninsula (Armenians, Crimean Tatars, Germans, and Greeks) who were deported en masse at the close of World War II. Another success has been the naturalization of Tajik refugees in Kyrgyzstan, as well as campaigns that have enabled 300,000 Tamils to acquire Sri Lankan citizenship. UNHCR also helped the Czech Republic reduce the large number of stateless persons created when it separated from Slovakia.

At the beginning of 2006, the UNHCR reported that it had records of 2.4 million stateless persons, and estimated that there were 11 million worldwide. By the end of 2014, UNHCR had identified close to 3.5 million stateless persons in 77 countries and estimated the total number worldwide to be more than 10 million.

UNHCR does not report refugee populations in its statelessness statistics to avoid double counting, which would affect the total number of "persons of concern". Stateless refugees are counted as refugees, not as stateless. For the same reason, Palestinian refugees under the mandate of the United Nations Relief and Works Agency for Palestine Refugees in the Near East (UNRWA) are not reported in the UNHCR statelessness table. Instead, they are referred to elsewhere in UNHCR's statistical reporting.

While the two UN conventions on statelessness constitute the primary international framework for the protection of stateless persons and the reduction of statelessness, there are also regional instruments of great importance. The 1997 European Convention on Nationality, for example, has contributed to protecting the rights of stateless persons and provides standards for reducing statelessness in the Council of Europe region. That document emphasizes the need of every person to have a nationality, and seeks to clarify the rights and responsibilities of states in ensuring individual access to a nationality.

Some of the largest populations of stateless persons are found in Algeria, Bangladesh, Bhutan, Cambodia, Côte d'Ivoire, Democratic Republic of the Congo, Dominican Republic, India, Kenya, Malaysia, Mauritania, Myanmar, Nepal, Brunei, Saudi Arabia, Bahrain, the United Arab Emirates, Kuwait, Qatar, Iraq, Syria, Lebanon, and Thailand.

Notable cases

Airports 
Some stateless people have received widespread public attention in airports due to their status as ports of entry.

One famous case is that of Mehran Karimi Nasseri, who lived in Charles de Gaulle Airport in France for approximately 18 years after he was denied entry to the country. He appeared to have no nationality, as his Iranian citizenship was taken away from him.  He had a British mother, but he still did not have British citizenship. The 1994 French film Tombés du ciel and the 2004 Tom Hanks American film The Terminal are fictional stories inspired by his experiences.

During change of citizenship 
Countries that restrict multiple nationality often require immigrants who apply for naturalisation to obtain official documentation from their countries of origin proving that they are no longer citizens. In others, including Taiwan, the documentation must be provided prior to the granting of citizenship. During the period between the cancellation of the prior citizenship and the granting of the new citizenship by naturalization, the applicant may be officially stateless. In two cases in Taiwan, Pakistani immigrants applied for naturalization and renounced their Pakistani citizenship. In the interim, the decisions to permit their naturalization as citizens of Taiwan were reversed, leaving them stateless.

Australia
 Australia had 37 stateless people in onshore detention, who had been detained for an average of 2 years and 106 days and the longest was 3 years and 250 days. The number of stateless people in offshore detention is unknown. There were a further 57 stateless people living in the community after being approved for a residence determination. In Australia statelessness is not itself a ground for grant of a visa and the person must instead rely upon other grounds, such as being a refugee. Notable cases include:

Ahmed Al-Kateb, a Palestinian man born in Kuwait who was denied a visa on arrival in Australia in 2000 and did not meet the requirements of a refugee. Al-Kateb wished to return to Kuwait or Gaza. However, Kuwait would not accept him (as he was not a Kuwait citizen or resident) and there was no state of Palestine at that time. To return him to Gaza required the approval of Israel. The High Court of Australia held in Al-Kateb v Godwin that his detention was lawful, even though it would continue indefinitely. Al-Kateb and eight other stateless people were granted bridging visas in 2005 and, while this meant they were released from detention, they were unable to work, study or obtain various government benefits. Al-Kateb was granted a permanent visa in October 2007.
'Baby Ferouz' was born in November 2013 to Rohingya Muslim parents who had fled from Myanmar, which did not recognise them as citizens. His parents and siblings were being held at the Nauru Detention Centre, however the family was flown to Brisbane due to complications in pregnancy, with the result that baby Ferouz was born in Australia. From 1986, Australia has not automatically granted citizenship to people born in Australia, despite the provision in the 1961 Convention on the Reduction of Statelessness requiring nationality to be given to children born in a territory who would otherwise be stateless. As baby Ferouz was deemed to be an unauthorised maritime arrival, he could not be given a protection visa. In December 2014 he and his family were given a temporary protection visa which allowed them to be released from immigration detention.
Said Imasi is believed to be from Western Sahara and had been granted a protection visa in Norway in 2004. In January 2010 he had a one-way ticket to New Zealand and was traveling on a friend's passport and was detained on a stop-over in Melbourne. His application for a refugee visa was refused because he did not have a "well-founded fear of persecution" in Norway. Because he has no visa to be in Australia and there is no country to which he can be returned, Imasi has been in immigration detention since January 2010, spending several years at the Christmas Island Detention Centre and later at the Villawood Immigration Detention Centre in Sydney.

Bahrain

Many individuals in Bahrain do not have nationality and they are called Bidoon. A number of people have also had their citizenship revoked and are now stateless; the revocation took place after they criticised the Bahraini government. This situation also occurs in other Middle Eastern countries.

Brazil 

Brazil is among the few countries in the world to have in its law the recognition of a stateless person to provide documents to this person as an official citizen of the country. Maha and Souad Mamo, who had lived in Brazil for four years as refugees, were the first stateless persons recognized by the Brazilian state after the creation of the new migration law (Law No. 13,445), which came into force in 2017. The migration law provides protective measures for stateless persons, facilitating the guarantees of social inclusion and simplified naturalization for citizens without a homeland. The legislation follows international conventions of respect for stateless persons and seeks to reduce the number of people in this situation, giving the right to request nationality. Countries having similar laws usually offer stateless persons the access to basic rights such as education and health, while in their documents they are still recognized as stateless with a residence permit. With its law, Brazil offers naturalization, which means that these persons can by all effects become Brazilians. If the stateless persons do not wish to apply for immediate naturalization, they are granted at least definitive residency in the country.

Brunei 
Many stateless permanent residents live in Brunei. Most have lived on Bruneian soil for generations, but Bruneian nationality is governed by the policy of jus sanguinis; the right to hold it comes from blood ties. The government of Brunei has made obtaining citizenship possible, albeit difficult, for stateless persons who have inhabited Brunei for many generations. Requirements include rigorous tests in Malay culture, customs, and language. Stateless permanent residents of Brunei are given an International Certificate of Identity, which allows them to travel overseas. The majority of Brunei's Chinese and Indians are permanent residents who are stateless.

Holders of International Certificates of Identity can enter Germany and Hungary visa-free for a maximum of 90 days within a 180-day period. In the case of Germany, in theory, for an individual to benefit from the visa exemption, the ICI must be issued under the terms of the 1954 Convention Relating to the Status of Stateless Persons, and it must contain an authorization to return to Brunei with a sufficiently long period of validity.

Brunei is a signatory to the 1959 Declaration of the Rights of the Child, which states that "the child shall be entitled from his birth to a name and a nationality", but it does not currently follow the guidelines of the convention. The Sultan of Brunei has announced changes that may expedite the process by which stateless persons with permanent residence status sit for citizenship exams.

Canada 
An amendment to the Canadian Citizenship Act (S.C. 2008, c. 14, previously Bill C-37) came into effect on April 17, 2009, and changed the rules for the acquisition of foreign-born Canadian citizenship. Individuals born outside Canada can now become Canadian citizens by descent only if at least one of their parents was either a native-born citizen or a naturalised citizen of Canada.

The new law limits citizenship by descent to one generation born outside Canada. All individuals born within one generation of the native-born or naturalised citizen parent are automatically recognised as Canadian citizens, but second-generation descendants born abroad are no longer citizens of Canada at birth, and such individuals might be stateless if they have no claim to any other citizenship. Since the passage of Bill C-37, this situation has already occurred at least twice:
 Rachel Chandler was born in China, to a Libyan-born father who is a Canadian citizen through the provision in the above paragraph and a mother who is a Chinese citizen. Because of the nationality laws of Canada and China, she was not eligible for citizenship in either country and was apparently born stateless. However, because Chandler's paternal grandfather was born in Ireland, she was entitled to Irish citizenship and now holds an Irish passport.
 Chloé Goldring was born in Belgium, to a Canadian father born in Bermuda and an Algerian mother. She was not eligible for automatic citizenship in Algeria, Belgium, or Canada, and was thus born stateless. Goldring is now a Canadian citizen.
Under Bill C-37, the term "native-born" is construed strictly: children born outside of Canada to Canadian government employees working abroad, including diplomats and Canadian Forces personnel, are considered foreign-born.

The bill was intended to resolve the status of so-called "Lost Canadians"—people who considered themselves Canadians, with undeniable connections to the country, but who had either lost or never been granted citizenship because of the vagaries of the country's previous nationality law.

Dominican Republic 
An estimated 800,000 Haitians reside in the Dominican Republic. For much of its history, the Dominican Republic had a jus soli policy, meaning that all children born in the country, even to undocumented parents, were automatically given citizenship. Most countries in the Western Hemisphere practice this policy, but in June 2013, the Dominican high court amended existing legislation to exclude from jus soli citizenship children born "in transit", such as the children of foreign diplomats and "those on their way to another country". Since 2013, the law has been expanded to address the children of non-citizens, such as Haitian migrants who immigrated after 1929.

Since the passing of the amendment, nearly 200,000 Dominicans of Haitian descent have been stripped of their Dominican citizenship. Without birth certificates, identification, or nationality, they are stateless and living illegally in the Dominican Republic. As of July 2015, according to the International Organization for Migration, about 1,133 individuals had voluntarily or involuntarily relocated to Haiti. By law, many are eligible to apply for naturalised citizenship in either Haiti or the Dominican Republic, but financial, bureaucratic, and discriminatory obstacles have prevented many from doing so.

Estonia and Latvia 

Estonia and Latvia, two neighboring European countries, were Russian Empire territories, separated upon independence in 1918, re-merged under Soviet occupation from 1940 until German occupation in 1941 and then again under renewed Soviet Occupation after 1944. When their independence was restored in 1991, citizenship was automatically restored to individuals who had been Latvian citizens prior to June 18, 1940, and their descendants or Estonian citizens prior to June 16, 1940, and their descendants.  Citizens of the Soviet Union who had moved to Estonia or Latvia while they were part of the Soviet Union did not receive citizenship automatically in 1991, and neither did their descendants. They had to apply for naturalisation as immigrants, a process that included a knowledge test and a language test in Estonian or Latvian. Children born after Latvia re-established independence (August 21, 1991), to parents who are both non-citizens, are also entitled to citizenship at the request of at least one of the parents.

These criteria mainly excluded ethnic Russians. Most were unable to pass the language test required. Russia has a visa waiver for stateless persons living in Estonia and Latvia, while Estonian and Latvian citizens need to obtain a visa to enter Russia. These stateless persons can also travel freely within the Schengen area, but they are not permitted to work within the European Union.  , more than 267,000 of residents of Latvia, and 91,000 of residents of Estonia, were stateless.

Greece 
Article 19 of the Greek Citizenship Code (Law 3370 of 1955) stated: "A person of non-Greek ethnic origin leaving Greece without the intention of returning may be declared as having lost Greek citizenship. This also applies to a person of non-Greek ethnic origin born and domiciled abroad. Minor children living abroad may be declared as having lost Greek citizenship if both their parents, or the surviving parent, have lost it as well." (The Minister of the Interior decides such cases, with the concurring opinion of the Citizenship Council.).

Article 19 was abolished in 1998, but no provision was established for restoring citizenship to people who had lost it. Interior Minister Alekos Papadopoulos stated that, since the article's introduction in 1955, 60,000 Greeks had lost their citizenship because of it, many of these people moved and adopted the nationality of another country. However, an estimated 300–1,000 people remain stateless in Greece (primarily minorities in Thrace, some of whom never settled abroad) and other former Greek citizens are stateless outside the country (an estimated 1,400 in Turkey and an unknown number elsewhere).

Stateless individuals in Greece have had difficulty receiving social services like health care and education. Until December 1997, they were denied the protection of the 1954 U.N. Convention Relating to the Status of Stateless Persons, which Greece ratified in 1975. Then, as a result of pressure from nongovernmental organizations and minority deputies, around 100 ethnic Turks made stateless under Article 19 received identity documents from Greek authorities in accordance with the 1954 U.N. Convention. In August 1998, Foreign Minister Theodoros Pangalos stated that within a year, most or all stateless persons living in Greece would be offered Greek citizenship; this promise was repeated in subsequent months by Alternate and Deputy Foreign Ministers George Papandreou and Giannos Kranidiotis. However, the government took no steps to carry out this promise.

Hong Kong 

Hong Kong, as a special administrative region of China, does not have its own citizenship laws. The right of abode is the status that allows unrestricted right to live, work, vote and to host most public office in Hong Kong; persons with right of abode in Hong Kong are called permanent residents. Most permanent residents of Chinese descent are Chinese citizens as provided by the Chinese nationality law. Citizens of other countries who have obtained right of abode in Hong Kong remain the citizens of their respective countries, and enjoy all the rights accorded to permanent residents except for those restricted to permanent residents with Chinese citizenship, such as the right to a HKSAR passport and the eligibility to be elected as the Chief Executive.

When Hong Kong was transferred from the United Kingdom to China on July 1, 1997, all British Dependent Territories citizens (BDTCs) connected to Hong Kong lost their British nationality, unless they had applied for the British National (Overseas) (BN(O)) status. Most BDTCs of Chinese descent became Chinese citizens. BDTCs who did not become Chinese citizens and did not apply for BN(O) status while holding no other citizenship became British Overseas citizens (BOCs). As BN(O) and BOC statuses do not provide right of abode in the United Kingdom, BN(O)s and BOCs of non-Chinese descent who do not hold any other citizenship are de facto stateless. However, British nationality law allows BN(O)s and BOCs who are otherwise stateless to register for full British citizenship. In addition, the Chinese nationality law as applied in Hong Kong provides the option of naturalisation as a Chinese national.

Chinese citizens from the mainland who had migrated to Hong Kong on a One-way Permit lose their mainland hukou (household registration). They then must reside in Hong Kong for 7 years before gaining the right of abode in Hong Kong. Therefore, persons who had migrated out of the mainland but have not obtained Hong Kong permanent residency, while technically not stateless, are unable to exercise rights and privileges associated with citizenship in either the mainland or Hong Kong.

Stateless permanent residents of Hong Kong and Chinese migrants without right of abode may apply for a Hong Kong Document of Identity for Visa Purposes, which allows them to travel overseas. This document (with few exceptions) requires the holder to apply for and receive a travel visa prior to departure from Hong Kong.

Children born to foreign domestic workers are not classified as citizens because Chinese nationality is determined by blood ties. Under the visa regulations governing foreign domestic workers, the government of Hong Kong may award an unconditional stay visa. Many of these children can obtain citizenship in their parents' country of birth. When they are put up for adoption, however, citizenship applications can become challenging. In cases where both adoptive parents are Chinese nationals, the children will likely remain stateless. Applying for Chinese citizenship by naturalisation is only possible for permanent residents of Hong Kong, and an unconditional stay visa does not grant this status.

Eliana Rubashkyn, a transgender woman and refugee, became de facto stateless in 2013 after being detained for over eight months on the grounds that her appearance did not match her passport photo. She suffered mistreatment in detention at Chek Lap Kok Airport and in Kowloon's Queen Elizabeth Hospital. She was granted refugee status, but Hong Kong did not recognize her as a refugee because it is not a signatory to the refugee convention of 1951 and sought to deport her to Colombia. In 2013, the UN sought a third country to resettle her due to the lack of protections for LGBT people and refugees in Hong Kong. After almost one year, a UN declaration recognized her as a woman under international law, and she was sent to New Zealand, where she received asylum.

South Asia 

As of 2012, India and Pakistan were each holding several hundred prisoners from the other for violations like trespass or visa overstay, often with accusations of espionage. Some of these prisoners have been denied citizenship in both countries, leaving them stateless. In Pakistani law, if one leaves the country for more than seven years without any registration from a Pakistani embassy or foreign mission of any country, they lose Pakistani citizenship.

In 2012, the BBC reported on the case of Muhammad Idrees, who lived in Pakistan and had been held under Indian police control for approximately 13 years for overstaying his 15-day visa by 2–3 days after seeing his ill parents in 1999. He spent much of those 13 years in prison waiting for a hearing, sometimes homeless or living with volunteer families. Both states denied him citizenship.

The BBC linked these problems to the political atmosphere caused by the Kashmir conflict. The Indian People's Union for Civil Liberties told the BBC it had worked on hundreds of cases with similar features. It called Idrees' case a "violation of all human rights, national and international laws", adding, "Everybody has a right to a nation." The Indian Human Rights Law Network blamed "officials in the home department" and slow courts, and called the case a "miscarriage of justice, a shocking case".

In Bangladesh, about 300,000–500,000 Bihari people (also known as Stranded Pakistanis in Bangladesh) were rendered stateless when Bangladesh seceded from Pakistan in 1971. Bangladesh refused to consider them citizens because of their support for Pakistan in the Bangladesh Liberation War while Pakistan insisted that since Bangladesh was successor state of East Pakistan, she had a responsibility to absorb the Bihari people into her nation as West Pakistan had done with refugees flooding from the war, including Bengali people. As a result, the Bihari people became stateless.

Over 100,000 Bhutanese refugees, who have neither Bhutanese nor Nepalese citizenship, reside in Nepal.

Indonesia 
In February 2020, the Indonesia government stated that any Indonesian national who ever joined the Islamic State of Iraq and the Levant (ISIL) had automatically lost their Indonesian citizenship. Presidential Chief of Staff Moeldoko stated that the ISIL sympathizers "are stateless". Article 23 of Indonesian nationality law states that Indonesian nationals can lose their citizenship after, among other things, "joining a foreign military or taking an oath of allegiance to another country".

Japan 
When Japan lost control over Korea in 1945, those Koreans who remained in Japan received Chōsen-seki, a designation of nationality that did not actually grant them citizenship. Roughly half of these people later received South Korean citizenship. The other half were affiliated with North Korea, which is unrecognized by Japan, and they are legally stateless. Practically speaking, they mostly hold North Korean citizenship (albeit meaningless in Japan, their country of residence) and may repatriate there, and under Japanese law, they are treated as foreign nationals and given the full privileges entitled to that class. In 2010, Chōsen-seki holders were banned from South Korea.

UNHCR published a study on statelessness in Japan in 2010.

Syria 
By 2011, close to an estimated 300,000 stateless Kurds were in Syria. While the government's implementation of the 2011 Decree did reduce the number of stateless persons, a significant part of Syria's remaining statelessness problem has now been 'exported' to new geographic and legal contexts with the displacement of affected persons out of the country.

Kuwait 

Kuwait has the largest number of stateless people in the entire region. Most stateless Bedoon of Kuwait belong to the northern tribes, especially the Al-Muntafiq tribal confederation. A minority of stateless Bedoon in Kuwait belong to the 'Ajam community. 

Under the terms of the Kuwait Nationality Law 15/1959, all the Bedoon in Kuwait are eligible for Kuwaiti nationality by naturalization. In practice, it is widely believed that Sunnis of Persian descent or tribal Saudis can readily achieve Kuwaiti naturalization whilst Bedoon of Iraqi tribal ancestry cannot. As a result, many Bedoon in Kuwait feel pressured to hide their  background. 

From 1965 until 1985, the Bedoon were treated as Kuwaiti citizens and guaranteed citizenship: they had free access to education, health care and all the other privileges of citizenship. The stateless Bedoon constituted 80-90% of the Kuwaiti Army in the 1970s and 1980s until the Gulf War.

In 1985 at the height of the Iran–Iraq War, the Bedoon were reclassified as "illegal residents" and denied Kuwaiti citizenship and its accompanying privileges. The Iran–Iraq War threatened Kuwait's internal stability and the authorities feared the sectarian background of the stateless Bedoon. The Bedoon issue in Kuwait "overlaps with historic sensitivities about Iraqi influence inside Kuwait", with many of those denied Kuwaiti nationality being believed to have originated from Iraq.

In 1985, the then emir, Jaber Al-Ahmad Al-Sabah, escaped an assassination attempt. After the assassination attempt, the government changed the Bedoon's status from that of legal residents to illegal residents. By 1986, the Bedoon were fully excluded from the same social and economic rights as Kuwaiti citizens. 

Since 1986, the Kuwaiti government has refused to grant any form of documentation to the Bedoon, including birth certificates, death certificates, identity cards, marriage certificates, and driving licences. The Bedoon also face many restrictions in employment, travel and education. They are not permitted to educate their children in state schools and universities. 

In 1995, Human Rights Watch reported that there were 300,000 stateless Bedoon, and this number was formally repeated by the British government. 

According to several human rights organizations, the State of Kuwait is committing ethnic cleansing and genocide against the stateless Bedoon. The Kuwaiti Bedoon crisis resembles the Rohingya crisis in Myanmar. In 1995, it was reported in the British parliament that the Al Sabah ruling family had deported 150,000 stateless Bedoon to refugee camps in the Kuwaiti desert near the Iraqi border with minimal water, insufficient food and no basic shelter, and that they were threatened with death if they returned to their homes in Kuwait City. As a result, many of the stateless Bedoon fled to Iraq, where they remain stateless people even today. The Kuwaiti government also stands accused of attempting to falsify their nationalities in official state documents. There have been reports of forced disappearances and mass graves of Bedoon.

The 1995 Human Rights Watch report stated:

"The totality of the treatment of the Bedoons amounts to a policy of denationalization of native residents, relegating them to an apartheid-like existence in their own country. The Kuwaiti government policy of harassment and intimidation of the Bedoons and of denying them the right to lawful residence, employment, travel and movement, contravene basic principles of human rights. Denial of citizenship to the Bedoons clearly violates international law. Denying Bedoons the right to petition the courts to challenge governmental decisions regarding their claims to citizenship and lawful residence in the country violates the universal right to due process of law and equality before the law." 

British MP George Galloway stated:

"Of all the human rights atrocities committed by the ruling family in Kuwait, the worst and the greatest is that against the people known as the Bedoons. There are more than 300,000 Bedoons—one third of Kuwait's native population. Half of them—150,000—have been driven into refugee camps in the desert across the Iraqi border by the regime and left there to bake and to rot. The other 150,000 are treated not as second-class or even fifth-class citizens, but not as any sort of citizen. They are bereft of all rights. It is a scandal that almost no one in the world cares a thing about the plight of 300,000 people, 150,000 of them cast out of the land in which they have lived [when] many have lived in the Kuwaiti area for many centuries." 

By 2004, the Bedoon accounted for only 40% of the Kuwaiti Army, a major reduction from their presence in the 1970s and 1980s. In 2013, the UK government estimated that there were 110,729 "documented" Bedoon in Kuwait, without giving a total estimate, but noting that all stateless individuals in Kuwait remain at risk of persecution and human rights breaches. The Bedoon are generally categorized into three groups: stateless tribespeople, stateless police/military and the stateless children of Kuwaiti women who married Bedoon men. According to the Kuwaiti government, there are only 93,000 "documented" Bedoon in Kuwait. In 2018, the Kuwaiti government claimed that it would naturalize up to 4,000 stateless Bedoon per year but this is considered unlikely.  

In recent years, the rate of suicide among Bedoon has risen sharply.

Pakistan 
Inside Karachi city there is a stateless population of approximately 1.2 million Pakistani Bengalis.

As of January 2022, there were approximately 3 million Afghans living in Pakistan, around 1.4 million of them are Proof of Registration (PoR) cardholders, approximately 840 000 hold an Afghan Citizen Card (ACC), and an estimated 775 000 are undocumented.

Philippines 
As of 2021, there are around 700 people of Japanese descent who are considered as stateless. Most of these people are descendants of Japanese fathers who settled in the Philippines in the early 20th century. Due to the outbreak of the World War II, many of these individuals got separated from their fathers who either got enlisted in the Imperial Japanese Army, repatriated to Japan or died during the war. After the war many of them settled in more remote areas of the Philippines and discarded proof of the Japanese nationality as a preventive measure against anti-Japanese retaliatory attacks due to atrocities committed by Japan during the war.

Qatar 
Most of Qatar's Bedoon are stateless tribesmen from the Ghufrani tribe. In 2005, Qatar stripped the citizenship of over 5,000 members of the tribe. After international outcry, it restored the citizenship of approximately 2,000. Today, there are between 1,200 and 1,500 Bedoon in Qatar.

United Arab Emirates 
In the United Arab Emirates, some stateless people were granted citizenship after many years/decades. Children of a foreign parent were also granted citizenship.

Stateless Palestinians 

Abbas Shiblak estimates that over half of the Palestinian people in the world are stateless.

Palestinians in Lebanon and those in Syria are constitutionally denied citizenship, and are thus stateless.

After Israel annexed East Jerusalem following the Six-Day War in 1967, Palestinians living there received, along with Israeli permanent residency status, the right to apply for citizenship. Shortly after the offer was made, it was rejected by Arab leaders. Between 1967 and 2007, only 12,000 of the 250,000 Palestinians living in Jerusalem have been granted Israeli citizenship. Since 2007, more have applied, although the majority still reject it. Those who do not have Israeli citizenship are generally stateless.

Many descendants of Palestinian refugees live permanently in countries of which they would be expected to be citizens, but they are not citizens because that country adheres to the policy of the Arab League in denying citizenship to Palestinians.

Even though Palestinians living in the West Bank and the Gaza Strip were issued Palestinian passports under the Oslo Accords and Palestinian legal statehood is somewhat widely acknowledged internationally as of 2018, some countries (such as the United States), recognize them as travel documents but do not recognize their citizenship. According to international law, only states can have nationals (meaning citizens), meaning that the remainder states who do not consider Palestine a state implement such policies and deem its holders as 'stateless'.

Saudi Arabia
Dissidents and other people can have their citizenship revoked. Osama bin Laden was asked to hand in his passport in the 1990s.

Myanmar 

The Rohingya people are minority group in Myanmar (formerly Burma) whose status as citizens of that country, and whose human rights in general, have been severely curtailed by the Burmese government.

Puerto Rico 

In 1994, Juan Mari Brás, a Puerto Rican lawyer and political historian, renounced his American citizenship before a consular agent in the United States Embassy of Venezuela. In December 1995, his loss of nationality was confirmed by the US Department of State. That same month, he requested that the Puerto Rico State Department furnish him with proof of his Puerto Rican citizenship. The request involved more than just a bureaucratic formality; Mari Brás tested the self-determination of Puerto Rico by trying to become the first Puerto Rican citizen who was not also an American citizen.

Mari Brás claimed that as a Puerto Rican national born and raised in Puerto Rico, he was clearly a Puerto Rican citizen and therefore had every right to continue to reside, work, and, most importantly, vote in Puerto Rico. The State Department responded promptly, claiming that Puerto Rican citizenship did not exist independent of American citizenship, and in 1998, the department rescinded its recognition of his renunciation of citizenship. The official response to Mari Brás stated that Puerto Rican citizenship existed only as an equivalent to residency. However, the Puerto Rico State Department issues certificates of citizenship to people born outside of Puerto Rico to a Puerto Rican parent, including some people who may have never resided in the territory.

Turkey 

Following a failed coup in 2016, the Turkish government revoked about 50,000 passports. While most of the people whose passports were revoked were in Turkey at the time, one notable Turkish expatriate affected by this action was NBA player Enes Kanter. He is a vocal critic of Turkish president Recep Tayyip Erdoğan and a public supporter of the Gülen movement, which the government blamed for the coup attempt. Kanter's passport was canceled while he was attempting to travel to the U.S., and he was briefly detained in Romania before being allowed to continue his travel. Turkey issued an arrest warrant against Kanter in May 2017, claiming that he was a member of "an armed terrorist organization." The government's action effectively rendered Kanter stateless, and soon after this incident expressed a desire to seek U.S. citizenship. He then held a U.S. green card, which technically enabled him to travel to and from Canada for games in Toronto. However, in the 2018–19 season, Kanter did not travel with his team to games in London or Toronto because Turkey had requested an Interpol red notice against him. On November 29, 2021, he became a naturalized U.S. citizen, changing his name to Enes Kanter Freedom.

Ukraine 

After the completion of his term, Georgian President Mikheil Saakashvili moved to Ukraine where he was given citizenship and appointed Governor of Ukraine's Odessa Oblast. Due to Georgian restrictions on dual nationality, he was stripped of his Georgian citizenship.

While visiting the U.S. in 2017, Saakashvili's Ukrainian citizenship was revoked by Ukrainian President Petro Poroshenko, leaving Saakashvili stateless. After the election of Volodymyr Zelensky in 2019, Saakashvili's Ukrainian citizenship was restored.

United Kingdom 

Different classes in British nationality law have led to situations in which people were considered British subjects but not nationals, or in which people held a British passport without right of abode in the United Kingdom. Examples include British Protected Persons, who are considered British nationals. British nationals (irrespective of the class of nationality) who reside abroad but are not entitled to protection by the British government are de facto stateless.

Many situations that put people at risk of statelessness were resolved after April 30, 2003, when the Nationality, Immigration and Asylum Act of 2002 came into force. As a result of this act, the United Kingdom gave most people with residual British nationality but no other citizenship the right to register as full British citizens. However, there are still some people who have not been able or willing to register as citizens. Following the publication of a joint UNHCR-Asylum Aid report in 2011, the UK adopted a statelessness determination procedure in 2013.

In January 2014, the Immigration Bill 2013–14 was introduced to extend the powers of the Home Secretary to deprive a naturalised British citizen of their citizenship, even if that renders the individual stateless, if the Secretary of State is satisfied that the deprivation of citizenship is conducive to the public good because the person "has conducted him or herself in a manner which is seriously prejudicial to the vital interests of the UK." A naturalised British citizen is someone who was not born a British citizen but has become one through the legal process of naturalisation, by which someone with no automatic claim to British citizenship can obtain the same rights and privileges as someone who was born a British citizen.

The bill was initially blocked by the House of Lords in April 2014. However, the Lords reconsidered their decision in May 2014, and the bill returned to the House of Commons before being set into UK law.

United States 
The United States, which is not a signatory to the 1954 Convention on the Status of Stateless Persons or the 1961 Convention on the Reduction of Statelessness, is one of a small number of countries that allow their citizens to renounce their citizenship even if they do not hold any other. The Foreign Affairs Manual instructs State Department employees to make it clear to Americans who will become stateless after renunciation that they may face extreme difficulties (including deportation back to the United States) following their renunciation, but to afford such persons their right to give up citizenship. Former Americans who have voluntarily made themselves stateless include Garry Davis in the beginning years of the United Nations, Thomas Jolley during the Vietnam War, Joel Slater as a political protest in 1987 while believing that he would obtain Australian citizenship, and Mike Gogulski as a political protest in 2008 without attempting to take any other citizenship. The UNHCR published a report on statelessness in the United States in 2012 in which it recommended the establishment of a determination procedure that incorporates a definition of statelessness in accordance with international law to ensure that stateless persons are permitted to reside in the United States.

The Fourteenth Amendment of the US Constitution granted citizenship to African American slaves. The Supreme Court ruling in United States v. Wong Kim Ark clarified that people born to aliens on US soil were entitled to citizenship under the Fourteenth Amendment. However, it excluded Native Americans by defining a citizen as any person born in the US, but only if "subject to the jurisdiction thereof"; this latter clause excluded anyone who was born in tribal nations within the United States, as the Supreme Court ruled in Elk v. Wilkins that they are "quasi-foreign nations who deal with Congress using treaties". The Indian Citizenship Act addressed the issue by granting citizenship to America's indigenous peoples.

Organizations

United Nations High Commissioner for Refugees

Statelessness mandate 
UNHCR's responsibilities were initially limited to stateless persons who were refugees, as set out in Paragraph 6(A)(II) of its statute and Article 1(A)(2) of the 1951 Convention relating to the Status of Refugees. They were expanded following the adoption of the 1954 Convention relating to the Status of Stateless Persons and the 1961 Convention on the Reduction of Statelessness. General Assembly Resolutions 3274 (XXIV) and 31/36 designated UNHCR as the body responsible for examining the cases of persons who claimed the benefit of the 1961 convention and assisting such persons in presenting their claims to the appropriate national authorities. Subsequently, the United Nations General Assembly conferred upon UNHCR a global mandate for the identification, prevention, and reduction of statelessness and for the international protection of stateless persons. This mandate has continued to evolve as the General Assembly has endorsed the conclusions of the UNHCR Executive Committee, notably Executive Committee Conclusion No. 106 of 2006 on the "identification, prevention, and reduction of statelessness and protection of stateless persons".

Global campaign to end statelessness 
The UNHCR launched a global campaign on November 4, 2014, to end statelessness within 10 years.

As part of the campaign, it published a special report providing a comprehensive overview of statelessness and delving into the human impact of the phenomenon. It also published an open letter addressed to states, urging them to take action. In addition to UNHCR High Commissioner António Guterres, the letter was signed by Angelina Jolie, a UNHCR special envoy; Surin Pitsuwan, former secretary-general of ASEAN; Shirin Ebadi, a Nobel Peace Prize laureate; Archbishop Emeritus Desmond Tutu; Barbara Hendricks, a UNHCR honorary lifetime goodwill ambassador; Madeleine Albright, former US secretary of state; Carla Del Ponte, former chief prosecutor of two UN international criminal tribunals; Zeid Ra'ad Al Hussein and Louise Arbour, former UN high commissioners for human rights; and Dame Rosalyn Higgins, former president of the International Court of Justice, among others.

In addition, a "global action plan to end statelessness" was launched following consultation with states, civil society, and international organisations. It sets out a guiding framework of 10 actions that need to be taken to end statelessness by 2024.

The plan includes actions to:
 resolve existing situations of statelessness;
 prevent new cases of statelessness from emerging; and
 better identify and protect stateless persons.

The 10 actions are:
 Action 1: Resolve existing major situations of statelessness.
 Action 2: Ensure that no child is born stateless.
 Action 3: Remove gender discrimination from nationality laws.
 Action 4: Prevent denial, loss, or deprivation of nationality on discriminatory grounds.
 Action 5: Prevent statelessness in cases of state succession.
 Action 6: Grant protection status to stateless migrants and facilitate their naturalisation.
 Action 7: Ensure birth registration for the prevention of statelessness.
 Action 8: Issue nationality documentation to those entitled to it.
 Action 9: Accede to the UN statelessness conventions.
 Action 10: Improve quantitative and qualitative data on stateless populations.

International Stateless Persons Organisation 
In March 2012, the International Stateless Persons Organisation (ISPO), an international non-governmental organization, was founded by Dr. Fernando Macolor Cruz, a tribal prince and instructor of history and political science at Palawan State University in the Philippines. It aims to provide institutional representation to stateless persons throughout the world through a network of volunteer human rights law practitioners who act as country representatives.

Institute on Statelessness and Inclusion 
The Institute on Statelessness and Inclusion is an independent non-profit organisation dedicated to leading an integrated, interdisciplinary response to statelessness. It works on research, analysis, empowerment, advocacy, and awareness globally. It also maintains an online forum on statelessness.

European Network on Statelessness 
The European Network on Statelessness, a civil society alliance, was set up to address the problem of 600,000 stateless persons in Europe and to act as a coordinating body and expert resource for organisations across Europe that work with or come into contact with stateless persons.

See also 
 Alien (law)
 Canvas ceiling 
 Certificate of identity
 List of people who have lived at airports 
 The Man Without a Country
 Multiple citizenship
 Nansen passport
 Nomad
 Perpetual traveller
 Refugee law
 Stateless nation
 The Terminal
 Uncontacted peoples

References

Further reading 
 Bronwen Manby, Struggles for Citizenship in Africa, 2009
 Laura Bingham, Julia Harrington-Reddy and Sebastian Kohn, De Jure Statelessness in the Real World: Applying the Prato Summary Conclusions, 2011
 Jay Milbrandt, Stateless, 2011
 Open Society Foundations and Refugees International, Without Citizenship: Statelessness, Discrimination, and Repression in Kuwait , 2011
 Nationality and Statelessness: a Handbook for Parliamentarians. High Commissioner for Refugees, Inter-Parliamentary Union, 2005
 Stateless Palestinians 
 Report describing US contributions to the resettlement of stateless populations in 2007
 Brad K. Blitz and Maureen Lynch. "Statelessness and the Benefits of Citizenship: A Comparative Study ."
 Siegelberg, Mira L. 2020. Statelessness: A Modern History. Harvard University Press.
 Somers, Margaret. 2008. Genealogies of Citizenship: Markets, Statelessness, and the Right to Have Rights. Cambridge University Press, 
 Unravelling Anomaly. Detention, Discrimination and the Protection Needs of the Stateless Persons. London: Equal Rights Trust, 2010. 
 Stateless: The World's Most Invisible People . Reuters AlertNet, 2011
 UN High Commissioner for Refugees (UNHCR) 2012 The State of the World's Refugees: In Search of Solidarity.

External links 

 International law: treaties and case law
 Full Convention text of 1961 Convention
 Map showing State Parties to the Statelessness Conventions
 Council of Europe Convention on Reduction of Statelessness in Relation to State Succession
 UN Convention relating to the Status of Stateless Persons  (full text)
 International case law on statelessness
 dhakatribune The stateless bangalis of karachi
 Intergovernmental organizations:
 UNHCR page on prevention and reduction of statelessness and protection of stateless persons – background information, tools and news From UNHCR website
 Refworld's special feature page on Statelessness
 UNHCR's #IBELONG campaign microsite
 International NGOs
 Statelessness  on the website of the Open Society Foundations
 Statelessness on the website of Refugees International
 Website of the International Observatory on Statelessness a clearinghouse for NGOs, academics, advocacy groups and policy-makers working on issues of statelessness
 Website of the Institute on Statelessness and Inclusion
 Website of the European Network on Statelessness
 Academic Institutions
 Website of the Statelessness Programme, an initiative of Tilburg Law School (Netherlands) dedicated to research, training and outreach on statelessness and related issues 
 Specific states
 British nationality – provisions for reducing statelessness 
 United States IRS Form 8898 (Renouncing citizenship).
 Documentary Film on Stateless person
 Man without a nation-documentary film

 
Nationality
Legal concepts